Stitchihatchie Creek is a stream in the U.S. state of Georgia. It is a tributary to Rocky Creek.

Stitchihatchie most likely is a name derived from the Muscogee language meaning "edge stream". Variant names are "Tickee Hatchee Creek", "Tickeehatchee Creek" and "Tickehachee Creek".

References

Rivers of Georgia (U.S. state)
Rivers of Laurens County, Georgia